Jiří Dolejš (born 24 January 1961) is a Czech communist politician.

He studied at the Faculty of Economics of the University of Economics in Prague. He graduated from there in 1984. From 1984 to 1990 he has worked in Prognostic Institute, later in the Czech Economic Policy Institute (1991–1992).

Dolejš is a member of the Czech communist party (KSČM) from January 1989, from 1993 to 1999 he was an employee of the Central Committee of the KSČM. In 1999 he became a vicechairman of the Central Committee of KSČM. From 2006 to 2021 he was a member of the Chamber of Deputies of the Czech Republic.

References

External links 
Jiří Dolejš (KSČM - official website)

1961 births
Living people
Communist Party of Bohemia and Moravia MPs
Prague University of Economics and Business alumni
Members of the Chamber of Deputies of the Czech Republic (2002–2006)
Members of the Chamber of Deputies of the Czech Republic (2006–2010)
Members of the Chamber of Deputies of the Czech Republic (2010–2013)
Members of the Chamber of Deputies of the Czech Republic (2013–2017)
Members of the Chamber of Deputies of the Czech Republic (2017–2021)